Souk el Tayeb is  an open-air weekly farmers market in Lebanon that specializes in organic food products. It is held every Saturday in downtown Beirut at the Beirut Souks, Trablos Street from 9am to 2pm.  

The market is organized and run by a non-profit cooperative headquartered at 226, Rue Gouraud in Gemmayzeh.  
The organic cooperative spans Lebanon's regions, religions and sects. Souk el Tayeb receives funding from European governments and from nongovernmental groups. According to the Los Angeles Times, the Italian government donated $600,000 for food-related projects in Lebanon after the 2006 war.

References

External links
Souk el Tayeb Website

Tourist attractions in Beirut
Food markets
Rural community development
Farmers' markets
Agriculture in Lebanon